Agaronia travassosi is a species of sea snail, a marine gastropod mollusk in the family Olividae, the olives.

Description

Distribution
Continental shelf offshore Sao Paulo state, Brazil 
sometimes trawled by shrimpers at 60-70 metres depth.

References

Olividae
Gastropods described in 1938